Jonathan Marvin Daly (born 8 January 1983) is an Irish football coach and former player who played as a forward. He began his senior career in England, where he played for Stockport County and Hartlepool United; he also had loan spells with Bury and Grimsby Town. He moved to Scottish football in 2007, when he signed for Dundee United. He spent over six years at the club, eventually becoming club captain, and won the Scottish Cup in 2010. He signed for Rangers in 2013, winning the League One title in his first season. He was described as the first Irish Catholic to join Rangers, a team with a Protestant identity.

Released by Rangers in 2015, Daly ended his playing career with Raith Rovers and retired in January 2016. He became a coach at Heart of Midlothian, where he was interim manager twice. He was twice included in the PFA Scotland Team of the Year awards, for the Scottish Premier League in 2012 and for League One in 2014. In international football, Daly represented the Republic of Ireland at all youth levels up to the under-21 team.

Club career

Stockport County
Born in Dublin, Ireland, Daly started his career at Irish amateur side Cherry Orchard, before signing for Stockport County in May 1998. At Stockport he scored regularly for the youth and reserve team. He began to make an impression on manager Andy Kilner during Stockport's pre-season tour of Scandinavia. He came on a substitute against Landskrona BoIS, and then started against Kristianstads, against whom he scored his first senior goal after lobbing the Kristianstad keeper.

The following season saw Daly become Stockport's second-youngest player when he came off the bench to make his first team debut against Walsall. However, he failed to secure a regular place and only appeared in five matches in his first two seasons. Consequently, he had to wait until the 2001–02 season before he scored his first senior goal against Bolton Wanderers in the FA Cup. He scored his first league goal later that season.

By the start of the 2002–03 season, Daly was regarded as one of Division 2's most promising strikers. He played more regularly and he was involved in 35 of Stockport's 46 league games, scoring seven goals. During this season, Stockport manager Carlton Palmer decided against naming a goalkeeper on the bench and revealed that he was planning to use Daly in goal should their keeper get sent off or injured. However, this never occurred and Daly never made an appearance in goal. In October 2004 he went on loan to Grimsby, and scored on his debut against Chester City. However, in his third and final appearance for Grimsby he was sent off against Scunthorpe United.

Hartlepool United
In February 2005, Daly signed for Hartlepool United, where he would stay for the next two years. Daly scored his first goal  against AFC Bournemouth, which helped seal a play-off spot. In the League One Play-off Final against Sheffield Wednesday, he scored with his first touch after coming on as a substitute to put Hartlepool in the lead.

Daly struggled to feature for the club the following season and was sent on loan to Bury. In the 2006–07 season, he again struggled to hold down a first team spot, although he scored seven goals over three games within a week, including the first hat-trick of his professional career against Wrexham on 30 September 2006. After this, he struggled to maintain his form and was surplus to requirements after Danny Wilson signed Richie Barker.

Dundee United
Daly was allowed to join Dundee United in January 2007 for an undisclosed fee. He made his debut for the club, on 13 January 2007, in a 5–0 loss against Rangers. He scored his first goal for the club in a 1–1 draw against League champions Celtic. After the match, his performance was praised by Craig Levein, who described him as "tireless up front and a lot of people don't see all the work he does." He scored again, the last game of the season, in a 4–2 win over Aberdeen. In May 2007, Daly suffered a posterior cruciate ligament injury, ruling him out for around six months, which affected the start of the season.

Having appeared four times on the bench, Daly made his return, on 10 November 2007, in a 2–0 win over Kilmarnock. However, on his next appearance, he suffered another injury, to his ankle, ruling him out for another two months. On 12 March 2008, Daly returned as a substitute for Craig Conway, in a 0–0 draw against Celtic.

On 23 December 2008, Daly signed a new three-year contract extension. On 11 January 2009, he provided an assist for Prince Buaben before scoring a goal for himself, in a 4–0 win over East Stirlingshire, in the fourth round of the Scottish Cup. In April 2009, he injured both his anterior and posterior cruciate ligaments, ruling him out of action for several months.

On his return in late November 2009, Daly scored in his first two substitute appearances, including a winner against Celtic before netting his second hat-trick for the club in January 2010, scoring three in the club's 4–1 win at Falkirk. Following his hat-trick, he would add two more goals, taking his tally to five goals in three appearances. He finished the season as Dundee United's top scorer, and picked up a Scottish Cup Winners medal in May 2010.

United manager Peter Houston subsequently named Daly as club captain for season 2010–11. He made his European debut in the qualification round against Greek side AEK Athens. The club lost 2–1 on aggregate. He suffered several injuries during the season, but scored twelve goals in all competitions, including a hat-trick as Dundee United beat Motherwwll 4–0.

In the 2011–12 season, Daly played in both legs of the UEFA Europa League tie against Polish side Śląsk Wrocław. In the second leg, following a 1–0 loss, he made an assist for David Goodwillie before scoring his first goal of the season, from the penalty spot, as Dundee United won 3–2. However, the club were eliminated under the away goal rule. He then signed contract extensions with the club until 2013.

In April 2012, Daly was awarded the March Player of the Month award. Shortly afterwards, he was nominated for the PFA Scotland player of the year award. He scored 19 goals in 36 matches for Dundee United by 1 April 2012, becoming a crucial part of the team and gained himself club captaincy. Daly scored 22 goals in 43 appearances in all competitions.

In the 2012–13 season, Daly was the second top-scorer in the league behind Johnny Russell. In the final year of his contract, he was linked with League Two side Fleetwood Town. Daly announced he was to leave the club at the end of the season.

Daly's exit from the club was confirmed on 19 May 2013 when he agreed a two-year deal with Rangers.

Rangers
On 24 May 2013, Daly agreed to join Rangers on a free transfer when the Glasgow club's transfer ban was lifted on 1 September 2013. On 4 March 2013, Rangers announced that they would make a move to sign Daly on a pre-contract deal. Manager Ally McCoist confirmed their interest in signing Daly. The move meant Daly would become the first Catholic player from the Republic of Ireland to sign for Rangers. McCoist himself said that he had no problem with Daly's religion or place of birth.

Ahead of the 2013–14 season, Daly scored his first goal for Rangers in a pre-season friendly against FC Emmen. He scored his first competitive goals for the club in a 6–0 away victory against Airdrieonians making the score 4–0 and 6–0. His next goal for Rangers was in a 3–0 victory over Queen of the South in the Scottish Challenge Cup Quarter Final on 17 September. On 28 September he scored four times in an 8–0 victory over Stenhousemuir. He scored another hat-trick in a 4–0 away win over East Fife on 26 October. He scored Rangers' only goal in the Ramsdens cup semi-final against Stenhousemuir to secure McCoist his first final as manager since taking over from Walter Smith in 2011. A few days after Daly scored a double against Airdrieonians in a 3–0 victory in the Scottish Cup booking Rangers place in the next round. He scored his 15th and 16th goals for the season in consecutive matches against Dunfermline and Airdrieonians respectively. He was ruled out for six weeks at the start of the 2014–15 season with a knee injury that required surgery.

On 29 May 2015, Daly confirmed that he had left Rangers and was a free agent.

Raith Rovers
Daly signed a short-term contract with Raith Rovers in August 2015. He scored his first goal for Raith in a 2–1 loss to Hibernian on 24 October 2015.

International career
Daly represented Republic of Ireland from under-14 to under-21 level and was hailed by Niall Quinn as his successor to the Republic of Ireland front line. Daly's talent was then recognised when he picked up Ireland's 2001 Youth Player of the Year award and he was also given the opportunity to progress to the under-21 team. Daly maintained his promise and scored in Ireland under-19's 3–2 victory over England.

For the next two years, Daly kept his place and became a frequent goalscorer in the Republic of Ireland under-21 national football team and went on to play at the 2003 FIFA World Youth Championship, playing in two of Ireland's group matches before their second round exit.

Coaching career
In November 2015, Daly agreed to join Hearts as coach of their under-20 team when his contract with Raith expired in January 2016. Following Robbie Neilson's departure, Daly was announced as joint interim manager of Heart of Midlothian with Andy Kirk. He was again placed in interim charge of the first team in August 2017, after the departure of Ian Cathro. Daly left Hearts in January 2020, soon after the appointment of Daniel Stendel as head coach.

In November 2020, Daly joined TPS Turku as assistant manager to former Rangers striker Jonatan Johansson. He also became manager of the under-23 team. It was announced in December 2021 that Daly had left the club by mutual agreement to return home for family reasons.

On 20 December 2021, it was announced that Daly had returned to Dublin to become assistant manager of League of Ireland Premier Division side St Patrick's Athletic under newly appointed manager Tim Clancy, who he had played against during his playing career in Scotland, as well as completing his coaching badges alongside Clancy.

Personal life
Daly is married to Linda and has two daughters. Though he was described as the first Irish Catholic to join Rangers, Daly is not religious and believes that the media coverage of that transfer was exaggerated.

Career statistics

Honours
Dundee United
Scottish Cup: 2010

Rangers
Scottish League One: 2014

References

External links
 
 Ireland stats at 11v11

1983 births
Living people
Association footballers from Dublin (city)
Republic of Ireland association footballers
Republic of Ireland youth international footballers
Republic of Ireland under-21 international footballers
Association football forwards
English Football League players
Scottish Premier League players
Scottish Professional Football League players
Stockport County F.C. players
Bury F.C. players
Grimsby Town F.C. players
Hartlepool United F.C. players
Dundee United F.C. players
Rangers F.C. players
Irish expatriate sportspeople in Scotland
Expatriate footballers in Scotland
Republic of Ireland expatriate association footballers
Raith Rovers F.C. players
Cherry Orchard F.C. players
Heart of Midlothian F.C. non-playing staff
Association football coaches